Portuguese Cemetery, also known as Gora Kabristan or Kacheri Cemetery is a cemetery located on VIP Road, Kanpur, India.  The road used to be called Amherst Street and still houses many government offices and residential bungalows.

History

In the 1760s, some traders had settled at Kanpur, including some Portuguese. The first British troops arrived around 1770, and Kanpur rapidly became a major garrison town. The foundation stone of the cemetery was laid in 1781 when Lieutenant Colonel John Stephen died in the city. The grave of Stephen is considered to be the oldest grave in the cemetery. The British Association for Cemeteries in South Asia has been providing financial aid to the cemetery since 1977.

References

Cemeteries in India
1781 establishments in India
Cemeteries established in the 1780s
Buildings and structures in Kanpur